Moshe "Musa" Peled (born 2 April 1945) is an Israeli former politician who served as a member of the Knesset for Tzomet, Mekhora and Moledet between 1992 and 1999.

Biography
Born in kibbutz Beit HaShita during the Mandate era, Peled did his national service in the Armoured Corps, attaining the rank of colonel. He became chairman of the Kibbutz Movement's defense committee and of the Northern Settlements Forum for the Defense of the Golan Heights.

A member of the Tzomet secretariat, he was elected to the Knesset on the party's list in the 1992 elections. He was re-elected on the joint Likud-Gesher-Tzomet list in the 1996 elections, and was appointed Deputy Minister of Education, Culture, and Sport. He left the position on 20 January 1998, but returned to the cabinet in the same role a week later. He resigned again on 2 November 1998.

On 4 March 1999 Peled left Tzomet and established his own faction, Mekhora. The new party immediately merged into Moledet. Moledet ran in the 1999 elections as part of the National Union alliance. Peled was placed eighth on its list, but lost his seat as the party won only four seats.

References

External links

1945 births
Living people
Deputy ministers of Israel
Jewish Israeli politicians
Jews in Mandatory Palestine
Mekhora (political party) politicians
Members of the 13th Knesset (1992–1996)
Members of the 14th Knesset (1996–1999)
Moledet politicians
People from Beit HaShita
Tzomet politicians